Kritsawat Kongkot (born  July 26, 1999) is a Thai professional footballer who plays as a goalkeeper for Thai League 2 club Krabi.

Honours

International
Thailand U-23
 2019 AFF U-22 Youth Championship: Runner up

References

1999 births
Living people
Kritsawat Kongkot
Association football goalkeepers
Kritsawat Kongkot
Kritsawat Kongkot
Kritsawat Kongkot
Kritsawat Kongkot